Gustaf Fredrik Carlén (29 December 1890 – 8 January 1975) was a Swedish long-distance runner who competed in the 1912 Summer Olympics. He finished 21st in the individual cross country competition (ca. 12 km). This was the eighth best Swedish result, so he was not awarded with a medal in the team cross country competition, where only the best three were honored. The course was rather hilly and ca. 12 km long; it was not made known to competitors before the race.

References

1890 births
1975 deaths
Swedish male long-distance runners
Olympic athletes of Sweden
Athletes (track and field) at the 1912 Summer Olympics
Olympic cross country runners
People from Nyköping Municipality
Sportspeople from Södermanland County